WGFR (92.7 FM) is a radio station broadcasting an adult album alternative format. Licensed to Glens Falls, New York, United States, the station serves the Glens Falls area.  The station is currently owned by Board of Trustees of SUNY Adirondack (formerly named Adirondack Community College). The studios are on the college campus, in Washington Hall.

While adult album alternative is WGFR's primary format, other formats are broadcast at various times of day.  For example, there is a block devoted to funk and hip hop during the late night hours, and students play a variety of music during set "specialty hours".

WGFR is used in two ways.   First, it is used as part of SUNY Adirondack's Radio/TV Broadcasting program.  Students are put on air as a requirement of college course COM 188, Applied Radio Production, and/or COM 191, Radio Station Operations. Students also create special programming through COM 188.  Other on-air programs are provided by people who have volunteered for an on-air slot.

There is a five-week DJ training course that is offered for those who want to be on the air at WGFR, but do not want to partake in the COM 188 or COM 191.

WGFR won Golden Microphone Awards at the March 2014 Intercollegiate Broadcast System annual conference in New York City.

Notable alumni
 Bob Barrett, WAMC, WYLR, WCKM
 Lou Carnevale, WKBE, WFFG, WRCN, WKJY
 Tim Celeste, WKBE, WCQL,  WWSC
 David Clark, WKBE
 Steve Cole, WENU
 Brian Delaney, WSTL, WCKM
 Alan Doane, WAMC, WGY, WFFG, WWSC, WKBE, WSCG, WKAJ, WABY
 Joe Donahue, WAMC
 Tom Jacobsen, WWSC, WYLR, WGNA
 Dan Kemp, WKBE, WFLY
 Bill Lee, WSCG
 Jenny Lewis, WCQL
 Dan Miner, WCKM
 Joe Neptune, WENU
 Joe Rosati, WHTZ
 Matt Stone WCKM
 Kate Sullivan, WFFG
 Drew Schiavi, WRGB-TV, ESPN
 Steve Teft WWSC
 "Young Pete" WCQL

References

External links

GFR
Adult album alternative radio stations in the United States
Radio stations established in 1977
1977 establishments in New York (state)
SUNY Adirondack